Muniz Memorial Classic Stakes is a Grade II American Thoroughbred horse race for horses aged four and older at a distance of one and one-eighth miles on the turf run annually in early March at Fair Grounds Race Course in New Orleans, Louisiana. The event currently offers a purse of $300,000.

History

The inaugural running of the event was on 28 March 1992 as the Explosive Bid Handicap named after the 1984 winner of the Louisiana Handicap, Explosive Bid. 

In 1994 the event was run in two split divisions. 

In 1996 the American Graded Stakes Committee upgraded the event to Grade III and once more to Grade II in 2001.

In December 2003 the Louisiana Racing Commission agreed to honor Mervyn R. Muniz, Jr., a longtime racing secretary at Fair Grounds Race Course who died in 2003 by renaming the event to the Mervin H. Muniz Jr. Memorial Handicap

There was no race in 2006 due to after effects of Hurricane Katrina which had damaged the Fair Grounds race track and moved the shortened meeting that season to Louisiana Downs.

The 2019 winner of the event Bricks and Mortar continued his successful undefeated season enroute to being crowned US Champion Male Turf Horse and US Horse of the Year.

In 2020 the conditions of the event were changed from handicap to stakes allowance with the name of the race modified to Muniz Memorial Classic Stakes.

Records
Speed  record:
  1:47.21  - Factor This (2020)  

Margins:
 6 lengths -  	Joyeux Danseur  (1998)

Most wins:
 2 - Proudinsky (GER) (2008, 2009)

Most wins by an owner:
 3 - Gary A. Tanaka (2001, 2002, 2008)

Most wins by a trainer:
 2 - Robert J. Frankel (2008, 2009)
 2 - William I. Mott (2013, 2016)
 2 - Chad C. Brown (2012, 2019)
 2 -  Brad H. Cox (2015, 2020)
 2 - Todd A. Pletcher (2010, 2021)

Most wins by a jockey:
 4 - Robby Albarado (1998, 2001, 2004, 2007)

Winners

Notes:

† In the 2005 running of the event longshot Rapid Proof was first past the post. However, after a positive test for dexamethasone Rapid Proof was disqualified, and A to the Z was declared the winner with all prizemoney redistributed according to the adjusted finishing order

‡ In the 1992 inaugural running, City Ballet was first past the post but was disqualified and place sixth for interference in the straight and Slick Groom was declared the winner.

See also
List of American and Canadian Graded races

References

Fair Grounds Race Course
Graded stakes races in the United States
Open mile category horse races
Turf races in the United States
Horse races in New Orleans
Horse racing
Recurring events established in 1992
1992 establishments in Louisiana
Grade 2 stakes races in the United States